Des Moines Area Regional Transit Authority (DART) operates mass transit service in Greater Des Moines. It is the largest public transit agency operating in the state of Iowa.

History
DART was founded in 1973 as the Des Moines Metropolitan Transit Authority, commonly known as the MTA. Formed by a partnership of the cities of Des Moines, West Des Moines, Clive, Windsor Heights, and Urbandale. The MTA eventually developed a 14-county carpool and vanpool system in addition to its bus system.

By 2006, population growth in varying regions of central Iowa led to Polk County and nineteen cities forming a regional transportation agency following changes to Iowa law in 2005.

Sunday service was added for the first time in 2007. In 2008, a free shuttle linked downtown Des Moines with the Iowa State Capitol.

DART has offered a free Park & Ride service during the Iowa State Fair since 2006.

Free wifi connectivity began to be offered on all buses in 2018. This was implemented at the same time new fareboxes were installed, which required an internet connection.

DART began a pilot electric bus program in October 2020, starting with seven Proterra Catalyst buses on route 60 (Ingersoll/University). The pilot program was funded by a grant from the Federal Transit Administration, with a local match from MidAmerican Energy.

DART is represented by a board of 12 Commissioners, one from each member government it serves. Today, DART services Altoona, Ankeny, Bondurant, Clive, Des Moines, Grimes, Johnston, Pleasant Hill, Urbandale, West Des Moines, Windsor Heights, and greater Polk County.

Structure
DART utilizes a hub and spoke system, designed to favor commuters, as opposed to point-to-point system. The network was redesigned in 2012 to utilize the new DART Central Station, which most local and express routes terminate at or pass through. A secondary hub around Valley West Mall connects multiple western routes. A northern crosstown route 50 (Euclid/Douglas Crosstown) was added in 2018.

DART also has On Call routes that operate within specific zones in the Greater Des Moines area.

DART Central Station
Located at 620 Cherry Street in downtown Des Moines, DART Central station serves as the primary hub of the DART system. Built in 2012, the $21 million bus transfer station was opened on the south end of downtown, ending decades of using Walnut Street as a transit mall. DART Central Station has been certified LEED Platinum, the highest certification of the LEED (Leadership in Energy and Environmental Design) Rating System of the U.S. Green Building Council. The site was selected in part due to proximity of the historic Rock Island Railroad depot, which is hoped to have passenger rail service in the future.

Routes

Local routes

Express rush hour-only routes

Former routes
2 Kingman (Discontinued on June 8, 2004 due to budget crisis)
9 Express Service (Split into Routes 91, 92, 93, 94, 95, and 96)
10 Pleasant Hill (Discontinued on April 25, 2010 due to budget crisis)
12 Urbandale Business Park (Discontinued on April 25, 2010 due to budget crisis)
51 Merle Hay Crosstown (merged with Route 5 on August 23, 2015)
71 Ankeny / Delaware Avenue (Discontinued on November 23, 2012)
73 Urbandale / Windsor Heights FLEX (peak only, 20-30 minutes; replaced by DART Flex Connect on October 13, 2019)
90 Airport South Business Park Express (Discontinued on June 10, 2012; replaced by extension of Route 8)
91 Merle Hay Express (Discontinued on October 1, 2017; replaced by extension of Route 5)
97 SW Park Avenue Express (Discontinued on November 22, 2003 due to budget crisis)
Windsor Heights Express (replaced with new Urbandale Express and On Call Service on March 4, 2002)
Urbandale Express (replaced with new Urbandale Express and On Call Service on March 4, 2002)
Summer Special (replaced with new Urbandale Express and On Call Service on March 4, 2002)

Shuttles
 The LINK (free)
 D-Line Shuttle (free) 
Iowa State Fair Park & Ride Shuttle

Flex Connect in Urbandale/NW Des Moines 
Flex Connect is a new on-demand service DART is testing that connects riders in the Flex Connect zone to DART buses. Flex Connect replaced Flex Route 73 in Urbandale and Windsor Heights.

With Flex Connect on weekdays, riders in the zone can book an Uber, YellowCabCo. taxi or a DART accessible vehicle to take them to and from one of three transfer points: Gloria Dei Park & Ride, Buccaneer Arena Park & Ride or Merle Hay Mall. From there, riders can connect to DART buses via routes 5, 14, 16, 50, 92 or 93.

On call

 Ankeny
 Bondurant
Easter Lake
 Grimes

Fleet

Fixed Route Ridership

The ridership and service statistics shown here are of fixed route services only and do not include demand response. Per capita statistics are based on the Des Moines urbanized area as reported in NTD data. Starting in 2011, 2010 census numbers replace the 2000 census numbers to calculate per capita statistics.

See also
 List of bus transit systems in the United States
 List of intercity bus stops in Iowa

References

External links
 Official Site

Bus transportation in Iowa
Transit agencies in Iowa
Ankeny, Iowa
Urbandale, Iowa